Mansa ( mansaw), a Maninka and Mandinka word for a ruler, is sometimes translated as "king", but correctly means "king of kings" or "emperor". It is particularly known as the title of the rulers of the Mali Empire, such as Mansa Musa, and in this context is sometimes translated as "emperor".

The word mansa was recorded in Arabic during the 14th century by North African writers such as Ibn Battuta and Ibn Khaldun, who explained it as meaning "sultan". Cognates of mansa exist in other Mandé languages, such as Soninke manga, Susu menge, and Bambara masa. According to Misiugin and Vydrin, the original meaning of the root word was probably "chief of hunters" or "chief of warriors". An alternate translation of mansa, which Jansen attributes to the followers of Marcel Griaule, is that mansa means "god", "the divine principle", or "priest-king". Jansen notes that they have not provided their reasoning for choosing this translation.

Empresses of the Mali Empire, such as Kassi, used the title Qasa instead of mansa.

List of Mansas

See also
Emperor
Faama, the title of king in the pre-imperial Mali
Mali Empire
Sundiata Keita, the first monarch to assume the title Mansa as "faama of faamas (king of kings)"

References

Works cited

 
 
 
 
 
 
 

Mali Empire
Titles of national or ethnic leadership
Mansas of Mali